Fatikchhari Girls Pilot High School (Bengali: ফটিকছড়ি বালিকা পাইলট উচ্চ বিদ্যালয়) is a secondary school for girls in Chittagong District, Bangladesh. It was established in 1958.

References 

Educational Institutions in Bangladesh
High schools in Bangladesh
Educational institutions established in 1958
1958 establishments in East Pakistan
Fatikchhari Upazila